Lamas is a Portuguese Freguesia (parish), located in the municipality of Braga. The population in 2011 was 842, in an area of 1.25 km².

References

Freguesias of Braga